Mercer Island station will be an at-grade Sound Transit East Link light rail station in the city of Mercer Island, Washington. It is expected to open along with the section of the line to Overlake in 2024.

Location 
The station will be located in the middle of I-90 in what was formerly the express lanes. It will have entrances at 77th Ave SE and 80th Ave SE. This location is just south of the Mercer Island Park & Ride and just north of Mercer Island's business district.

References 

Future Link light rail stations
Link light rail stations in King County, Washington
Railway stations scheduled to open in 2024
Railway stations in highway medians